Thurvaston is a small village in South Derbyshire. In 1970 the population (together with Osleston) was put at 200. This represents a general fall since 1871 when the population was just below 400. As at the census 2011 the population is now listed in the civil parish of Osleston and Thurvaston.

History
Recent excavations have revealed extensive archaeological remains dating back from before 1400. In 2006, both Thurvaston and nearby Sutton-on-the-Hill were identified as sites for future housing. This was based on a survey which identified the high cost of housing and the high number of bedrooms per residence compared with the small number of children in the area.

See also
Listed buildings in Osleston and Thurvaston

References

External links

Villages in Derbyshire
South Derbyshire District